Rock Musique Deluxe is the second album by Canadian alternative rock band Crash Karma. It was released on August 6, 2013.

Track listing
 "Appetite For Life" - 3:50
 "Tomorrow (ft. Ian D'Sa)" - 3:20
 "Man on Trial" - 3:36
 "Everything" - 4:35
 "Finally Free" - 3:30
 "What Ever Happened" - 3:47
 "Leave Her Alone" - 3:42
 "Spinning" - 3:35
 "It's For Love" - 3:54
 "When You're Gone" - 3:45
 "Tonight" - 4:26
 "Don't It Feel" (Bonus Track) - 3:43

Personnel
 Edwin - Vocals
 Mike Turner - Guitar
 Jeff Burrows - Drums, Percussion
 Amir Epstein - Bass

References

2013 albums
Crash Karma albums
E1 Music albums